Crutherland is a new area of East Kilbride, backing onto Torrance House Golf Course (part of Calderglen Country Park). around 60 large houses were built in 2006 -2007; it is situated adjacent to the Crutherland House Hotel.

Areas of East Kilbride